The aerobic gymnastics tournaments at the 2001 World Games in Akita was played between 17 and 18 August. 46 acrobatic gymnastics competitors, from 13 nations, participated in the tournament. The aerobic gymnastics competition took place at Akita City Gymnasium.

Participating nations

Medal table

Events

References

External links
 Fédération Internationale de Gymnastique
 Gymnastics on IWGA website
 Results

 
2001 World Games
World Games
2001
International gymnastics competitions hosted by Japan